Bibledit is series of related open source software projects for editing and translating the Bible. Bibledit is a free software.

History 

Bibledit development started in 2003.

The word "Bibledit" is a portmanteau of the words "Bible" and "edit".

Bibledit was first hosted on SourceForge.

First generation 

Bibledit-Gtk was the first generation of the software. It runs on the desktop. Like all Bibledit programs, its source code is public, and it can be freely downloaded.

Second generation 

The second generation of Bibledit focused on the web.

Bibledit-Web is a Bible editor that runs on the web, allowing users to edit the Bible from a web browser. The source code is public, and freely downloadable.

Several version of the software have been built to work with other Bible software. Bibledit-Xiphos and Bibledit-BibleTime work with different versions of The SWORD Project. Versions also exist for BibleWorks, Paratext, and OnlineBible.

Third generation 

The third generation of Bibledit focuses on cloud computing and multiple computing devices. It is actively being developed and maintained. The source code is public.

Similar to Bibledit-Web, Bibledit Cloud on the web, allowing users to edit the Bible from a web browser.
 
Offline versions are available for Windows, Mac OS X, Linux, Android, and iOS. Users can edit the Bible from a web browser or app while off-line, and then synchronize the changes with Bibledit Cloud. The Android version is installed via Google Play. iOS installation is through the App Store.

Usage 

The Bibledit translation software is known to and used by people involved in Bible translation and production.

SIL International includes Bibledit in their list of software and fonts.

The Adapt It translation software can exchange files with Bibledit.

The Bible society of Baptist Mid-Missions has made a Bibledit Windows port for their translators.

Pioneer Bible Translators wrote in-depth reviews of Bibledit.

References

External links
 
 Bibledit on YouTube
 Bibledit on Vimeo
 
 Bibledit for Windows 
 Bibledit summary on GNU Savannah
 Bibledit for Android 

Electronic Bibles
Free software
Software that uses GTK